New Hartford Center is a census-designated place (CDP) in Litchfield County, Connecticut, United States. It comprises the village of New Hartford, the adjacent Pine Meadow Historic District, and some surrounding forest land, all within the town of New Hartford. As of the 2010 census, the population of New Hartford Center was 1,385, out of 6,970 in the entire town of New Hartford.

Geography
New Hartford Center is in the northeast part of the town of New Hartford, in the valley of the West Branch of the Farmington River. The northern edge of the CDP follows the New Hartford–Barkhamsted town line. The CDP extends east to Connecticut Route 219 on the east side of Lake McDonough, a reservoir on the East Branch of the Farmington River. The CDP extends south nearly to the confluence of the East and West Branches of the Farmington, then runs west along Henderson Road to Steele Road and Burdick Road.

U.S. Route 44 passes through the community as Main Street, leading northwest  to Winsted and southeast  to Hartford, the state capital. Connecticut Route 219 leads southwest through the town of New Hartford  to U.S. Route 202, and northeast  to Barkhamsted.

Demographics
As of the census of 2010, there were 1,385 people, 592 households, and 375 families residing in the CDP. There were 635 housing units, of which 43, or 6.8%, were vacant. The racial makeup of the CDP was 95.4% White, 0.8% African American, 0.2% Native American, 1.4% Asian, 0.3% some other race, and 1.9% from two or more races. Hispanic or Latino of any race were 3.0% of the population.

Of the 592 households in the community, 28.0% had children under the age of 18 living with them, 47.3% were headed by married couples living together, 11.8% had a female householder with no husband present, and 36.7% were non-families. 27.2% of all households were made up of individuals, and 7.4% were someone living alone who was 65 years of age or older. The average household size was 2.33, and the average family size was 2.85.

20.6% of the CDP population were under the age of 18, 7.0% were from 18 to 24, 26.5% were from 25 to 44, 34.0% were from 45 to 64, and 11.9% were 65 years of age or older. The median age was 42.3 years. For every 100 females, there were 104.0 males. For every 100 females age 18 and over, there were 104.1 males.

For the period 2013-17, the estimated median income for a household in the CDP was $49,750, and the median income for a family was $60,859. The per capita income for the CDP was $26,122.

References

New Hartford, Connecticut
Villages in Litchfield County, Connecticut
Census-designated places in Litchfield County, Connecticut